Joel Vieira Pereira (born 28 September 1996) is a Portuguese professional footballer who plays as a right-back for Ekstraklasa club Lech Poznań.

Club career
Pereira was born in the village of Perosinho in Vila Nova de Gaia, Porto District. He played youth football for four clubs, including FC Porto from ages 11 to 17; he finished his development at Vitória de Guimarães.

On 16 September 2015, Pereira made his professional debut with Vitória's reserves in the LigaPro, featuring the full 90 minutes in a 0–0 home draw against Atlético Clube de Portugal. In the 2017 January transfer window he signed with fellow league team Académico de Viseu FC, being voted the league's best right-back at the end of the 2017–18 season alongside FC Porto B's Diogo Dalot.

Subsequently, Pereira took his game to the Cypriot First Division, first with Doxa Katokopias FC then AC Omonia. On 31 January 2020, the latter club loaned him to Slovak Super Liga's FC Spartak Trnava on a six-month loan deal with an option to buy, being signed at the request of manager Ricardo Chéu and reuniting with his former Doxa teammate Bogdan Mitrea.

Pereira was loaned to Gil Vicente F.C. on 13 August 2020. He made his debut in the Portuguese Primeira Liga on 27 September, playing the entire 1–0 victory over Portimonense S.C. at the Estádio Cidade de Barcelos.

On 31 May 2021, Pereira signed a four-year contract with Polish club Lech Poznań.

Career statistics

Honours
Lech Poznań
Ekstraklasa: 2021–22

References

External links

Portuguese League profile 

1996 births
Living people
Sportspeople from Vila Nova de Gaia
Portuguese footballers
Association football defenders
Primeira Liga players
Liga Portugal 2 players
Padroense F.C. players
Vitória S.C. B players
Académico de Viseu F.C. players
Gil Vicente F.C. players
Cypriot First Division players
Doxa Katokopias FC players
AC Omonia players
Slovak Super Liga players
FC Spartak Trnava players
Ekstraklasa players
II liga players
Lech Poznań players
Lech Poznań II players
Portugal youth international footballers
Portuguese expatriate footballers
Expatriate footballers in Cyprus
Expatriate footballers in Slovakia
Expatriate footballers in Poland
Portuguese expatriate sportspeople in Cyprus
Portuguese expatriate sportspeople in Slovakia
Portuguese expatriate sportspeople in Poland